The Gargano National Park is a national park in the province of Foggia in southern Italy. Aside from the Gargano promontory (encompassing the ancient woodlands of the Foresta Umbra) from which it takes its name, it includes also the Tremiti Islands archipelago and the wetlands Lago Salso. It is the largest park in Apulia.

The National Park of Gargano (UNESCO site) is one of the few national protected areas efficiently contributing to the "un Bosco per Kyoto" project, which in 2007 has involved several schools in the realization of projects for a social and responsible tourism. It is one of the most appreciated areas, unique for the decrease of fires and for the politics of environmental awareness.

See also
Daunia
Tavoliere delle Puglie
Apulia
Garganica, the local breed of goat
Trabucco a giant fishing machine belonging to Gargano tradition
1627 Gargano earthquake

Presidents
Giandiego Gatta (2004-2010)
Stefano Pecorella (2012-2017)
Pasquale Pazienza (2019-)

External links 
Official website

References 

Gargano
Protected areas established in 1991
Parks in Apulia
1991 establishments in Italy
Primeval Beech Forests in Europe